The 2012 Qatar Open (also known as 2012 Qatar ExxonMobil Open for sponsorship reasons) was a men's tennis tournament played on outdoor hard courts. It was the 20th edition of the Qatar Open, and part of the ATP World Tour 250 series of the 2012 ATP World Tour. It took place at the Khalifa International Tennis and Squash Complex in Doha, Qatar, from January 2 through January 7, 2012. Jo-Wilfried Tsonga won the singles title.

Finals

Singles

 Jo-Wilfried Tsonga defeated  Gaël Monfils 7–5, 6–3
It was Tsonga's 1st title of the year and 8th of his career.

Doubles

 Filip Polášek /  Lukáš Rosol defeated  Christopher Kas /  Philipp Kohlschreiber 6–3, 6–4

Singles main-draw entrants

Seeds

 Rankings are as of December 26, 2011

Other entrants
The following players received wild cards:
  Jabor Al Mutawa
  Sergei Bubka
  Malek Jaziri

The following players received entry from the qualifying draw:
  Matthias Bachinger
  Denis Gremelmayr
  Roberto Bautista Agut
  Grega Žemlja

Retirements
The following players retire from the singles main draw:
  Alex Bogomolov Jr. (right ankle injury)
  Roger Federer (back injury)

Doubles main-draw entrants

Seeds

 Rankings are as of December 26, 2011

Other entrants
The following pairs received wildcards into the doubles main draw:
  Jabor Al Mutawa /  Mohammed Ghareeb
  Sherif Sabry /  Mohamed Safwat

Retirements
  Alex Bogomolov Jr. (right ankle injury)

References
General

Specific

External links
 Official website
 ATP tournament information
 ITF tournament edition details

 
Qatar Open
Open
Qatar Open (tennis)